Achiase constituency was created in 2012 prior to the December elections. The parliamentary seat was contested in 2012 by Robert Kwasi Amoah (a teacher) of the NPP and Dr. Kwasi Akyem Apea-Kubi (a specialist gynaecologist) of the NDC and was won by Robert Kwasi Amoah. 
The Constituency was born out of a redemarcation of the Akim Swedru constituency, which became Achiase Constituency and Akim Swedru Constituency.

In the 2016 elections, the incumbent - Robert Kwasi Amoah - retained his seat in parliament after a challenge by S.Y Kwakye (an economist). 
Heading into the 2020 general elections, Mr. Robert Amoah had lost his mandate to contest as the MP at the NPP's primaries to Kofi Ahenkorah Marfo (the NPP's former constituency chairman). Mr. Marfo won the general elections to become the Member of Parliament, having defeated Dr. Kwasi Akyem Apea-Kubi who was widely tipped to win given that it was his 4th time trying (2000, 2008, 2012 and 2020).

References

Parliamentary constituencies in the Eastern Region (Ghana)